The 1921 Chicago Maroons football team was an American football team that represented the University of Chicago during the 1921 Big Ten Conference football season.  In their 30th season under head coach Amos Alonzo Stagg, the Maroons compiled a 6–1 record, finished in a tie for second place in the Big Ten Conference, and outscored their opponents by a combined total of 111 to 13.

Notable players on the 1921 team included end Fritz Crisler, quarterback Milton Romney, fullback John Webster Thomas, guard Charles Redmon, and tackle Charles McGuire.

Schedule

References

Chicago
Chicago Maroons football seasons
Chicago Maroons football